Zerker may refer to:

 Thunder Zerker, character in the Japanese video game Mega Man Star Force 2
 Zerkaa (born 1992), English YouTuber also known by his stage name Josh Zerker
 Zerker Road, Kern County, California

See also
 Berserk (disambiguation)
 Berserker (disambiguation)
 Zerka (disambiguation)